Wimboldsley is a former civil parish, now in the parish of Stanthorne and Wimboldsley, in Cheshire West and Chester, England.  It contains seven buildings that are recorded in the National Heritage List for England as designated listed buildings.   The parish is completely rural, and the Middlewich Branch of the Shropshire Union Canal passes through it.  The listed buildings consist of three bridges crossing the canal, a country house and its reset gate-piers, and two farm buildings.

Key

Buildings

References

Citations

Sources

Listed buildings in Cheshire West and Chester
Lists of listed buildings in Cheshire
Cheshire West and Chester